John McEnroe was the defending champion.

McEnroe successfully defended his title, defeating Ivan Lendl 7–5, 6–3 in the final.

Seeds

  John McEnroe (champion)
  Ivan Lendl (final)
  Jimmy Connors (semifinals)
  Kevin Curren (third round)
  Anders Järryd (quarterfinals)
  Stefan Edberg (quarterfinals)
  Eliot Teltscher (quarterfinals)
  Johan Kriek (third round)
  Tim Mayotte (third round)
  Scott Davis (first round)
  Henrik Sundström (third round)
  Tomáš Šmíd (first round)
  Vitas Gerulaitis (third round)
  Sammy Giammalva Jr. (third round)
  Jimmy Arias (semifinals)
  Ramesh Krishnan (quarterfinals)

Draw

Finals

Top half

Section 1

Section 2

Section 3

Section 4

External links
 Main draw

1985 Grand Prix (tennis)